Arthur Murphy may refer to:

Arthur Murphy (writer) (1727–1805), pseudonym Charles Ranger, Irish writer
Arthur Murphy (broadcaster) (1928–2019), Irish television and radio broadcaster
Arthur Edward Murphy (1901–1962), American philosopher
Arthur G. Murphy Sr. (died 1978), American politician in the Maryland House of Delegates
Arthur H. Murphy (1831–1903), Canadian entrepreneur and political figure in Quebec
Arthur Murphy (Idaho politician) (1898–1977), American politician from Idaho
Arthur P. Murphy (1870–1914), U.S. Representative from Missouri
Arthur W. Murphy,  law professor at Columbia University
Arthur William Murphy (1891–1963), Australian engineer and aviator in the Royal Australian Air Force
Art Murphy (1942–2006), American classical and jazz musician, pianist and composer